Eupithecia herczigi is a moth in the family Geometridae that is endemic to Thailand.

The forewings are dirty white with four to five brown blotches and the hindwings are dark brown.

References

External links

Moths described in 2009
Endemic fauna of Thailand
Moths of Asia
herczigi